Royal Portrush Golf Club is a private golf club in County Antrim, Northern Ireland. The 36-hole club has two links courses, the Dunluce Links (the championship course) and the Valley Links. The former is one of the courses on the rota of the Open Championship and last hosted the tournament in 2019.

In 1951, Royal Portrush first hosted the Open Championship, the oldest of golf's major championships; it was the first Open not held on the island of Great Britain. The Open returned to Portrush in 2019, and it will host again in 2025. It also hosted the Irish Open in 2012, the first in Northern Ireland since 1953.

The Dunluce Links course is considered to be one of the best courses in the world. It was ranked fourth by Golf World in their list of "The 100 greatest courses in the British Isles" in November 1996. Golf Magazine ranked it twelfth in their list of the Top 100 Courses in the World, and Golf Digest ranked it as the fourth best course outside the United States in 2007.

Location
Situated on the North Antrim Causeway Coast, Royal Portrush occupies a triangle of giant sand hills with views of the hills of Inishowen in County Donegal in the west, the Isle of Islay and Southern Hebrides in the north, with the Giant's Causeway and the Skerries in the east. The course is overlooked by the ruins of the 13th century Dunluce Castle, which gives its name to Dunluce course.

History
The Royal Portrush Golf Club was founded  in 1888 as The County Club. It became The Royal County Club in 1892 under the patronage of the Duke of York and assumed its present name in 1895 under the patronage of the Prince of Wales. In 1947, Rathmore Golf Club member Fred Daly became the first Irishman to win The Open Championship, and four years later the club hosted the championship itself, the first time the event was held in Northern Ireland. The club has also hosted the Senior British Open Championship between 1995 and 1999 and again in 2004.  The club was also host to the 2010 Palmer Cup. Daly's feat was repeated by club member Darren Clarke in 2011. Clarke also named Royal Portrush his favourite golf course in the world.

The second course at Royal Portrush is the Valley Links, and is used mostly by members of the 'town' club Rathmore and the ladies and juniors of Royal Portrush. It is shorter and considered less demanding than the Dunluce Links. Rathmore clubhouse and the ladies clubhouse are situated adjacent to the first tee. A six-hole pitch and putt course, named Skerries, starts from the same location. There is also a driving range at the club.

Rathmore Golf Club
The Valley Links is the home of Rathmore Golf Club whose clubhouse is situated near the first tee. Famous members include 1947 Open Champion Fred Daly and 2010 U.S. Open champion Graeme McDowell.

Signature holes
On the Dunluce course at Portrush there are several signature holes on both the front and back nine. In particular are the fourth, fifth and sixteenth holes. The fourth hole is a long par four which is more than 480 yards from the championship tees, with out of bounds right and thick rough on the left. There are several bunkers in the undulating fairway and the green is placed between two small sand hills. The fifth hole is a relatively short downhill par four with a dogleg to the right. It has no bunkers but a heavily undulating green perched on the edge of a large drop down to the beach and has views across the White Rocks beach, and the Dunluce Castle after which the course was named. The sixteenth hole, named Calamity Corner, but locally known as just "Calamity" is a long 236 yard, uphill par three. It is played to a green over a huge ravine short and right, with mounds and hollows to the back and left of the green. Only one member is known to have made more than 1 ace at Calamity. Michael Henry made the feat in both 2007 and 2019.

The Open Championship
The Open Championship was first staged at Royal Portrush in 1951; Max Faulkner won his sole major championship. The Open next returned to Portrush 

A number of course changes were made in preparation for the 2019 Open. The 17th and 18th holes of the original Dunluce Links, the Championship course, were replaced by two new holes (the 7th and 8th) on land that was part of the Valley Links. Holes 7 to 16 were redesignated as holes 9 to 18 on the redesigned course. The land freed-up by removing the prior 17th and 18th holes was used for the tented village. The total number of bunkers also increased from 59 to 62. Since the Valley Links lost two holes to the Dunluce Links, a number of changes are also having to be made to that course.

Shane Lowry was victorious in the 2019 Open Championship.

Irish Open
The club's Dunluce course held the 2012 Irish Open which was won by Jamie Donaldson. This was the first time that a European Tour event had been played in Northern Ireland and the first time since 1953 that the Irish Open had been played in Northern Ireland; it was last played at Royal Portrush in 1947.

Scorecards

Dunluce Links – Championship tees

Valley Links – Championship tees

Gallery

See also
 List of golf clubs granted Royal status
 Royal County Down Golf Club
 Portstewart Golf Club
 Ballyliffin Golf Club

References

External links

 
 Golf Club Atlas Guide – Royal Portrush Golf Club (Dunluce Links)

1888 establishments in Ireland
Sports venues completed in 1888
Organisations based in the United Kingdom with royal patronage
The Open Championship venues
Sports clubs in County Antrim
Golf clubs and courses in Northern Ireland
Golf clubs and courses designed by Harry Colt
Portrush
Irish Open (golf) venues
Royal golf clubs